Kathleen Ryan (8 September 1922 – 11 December 1985) was an Irish actress.

She was born in Dublin, Ireland of Tipperary parentage and appeared in British and Hollywood films between 1947 and 1957. In 2020, she was listed as number 40 on The Irish Times'''s list of Ireland's greatest film actors.

Family

Ryan's father died in 1933, shortly after he had been elected to Ireland's senate. Her brother was John Ryan, an artist and man of letters in bohemian Dublin of the 1940s and 1950s, who was a friend and benefactor of a number of struggling writers in the post-war era, such as Patrick Kavanagh. He started and edited a short-lived literary magazine entitled Envoy. Among her other siblings were Fr. Vincent (Séamus), a Benedictine priest at Glenstal Abbey, Sister Íde of the Convent of The Sacred Heart, Mount Anville, Dublin, Oonagh (who married the Irish artist Patrick Swift), Cora who married the politician, Seán Dunne, T.D. 

Ryan's schooling came in convents and universities. She married Dermod Devane in the society wedding of 1944 and the couple had three children, but the marriage was annulled in 1958.

Career
Ryan acted with the Dublin Abbey Players and at Longford's Gate Theater. She was discovered by Carol Reed, and her film debut was in a leading role in Odd Man Out (1947). Arthur Rank, to whom she was under contract, turned down subsequent offers for her to act in films, but she resumed film work after that contract expired. Her other films included Captain Boycott (1947) and The Sound of Fury (1950). She also appeared in the English-made Christopher Columbus (1949), but censors removed her from the version shown in the United States. Her role involved "a romantic interlude in Columbus's life," she said, "and that did not meet with approval in America because of prevailing traditions regarding the discoverer of this continent."

 Painting 
Ryan was the subject of one of Louis le Brocquy's most striking portraits, Girl in White, which he painted in 1941 and entered in the RHA exhibition of that year. The portrait (oil on canvas) is in the Ulster Museum collection.

 Death 
Ryan died in Dublin in December 1985 from a lung ailment at the age of 63. She was buried with her parents beneath a statue of the Blessed Virgin Mary, near the Republican Plot in Glasnevin Cemetery, Dublin.

Filmography
 Odd Man Out (1947)
 Captain Boycott (1947)
 Esther Waters (1948)
 Give Us This Day (1949)
 Christopher Columbus (1949)
 Prelude to Fame (1950)
 The Sound of Fury (1950)
 The Yellow Balloon (1953)
 Laxdale Hall (1953)
 Captain Lightfoot (1955)
 Jacqueline (1956)
 El Aventurero (AKA Sail into Danger)'' (1957)

References

External links

Kathleen Ryan (Devane) in 'Actors' file at Limerick City Library, Ireland
Girl in White by Louis le Brocquy
garethsmovies.blogspot
Photos of Kathleen Ryan

1922 births
1985 deaths
Irish film actresses
Actresses from County Dublin
20th-century Irish actresses
Burials at Glasnevin Cemetery
Irish stage actresses
Irish expatriates in the United States
Irish expatriates in the United Kingdom